The 2009 NBA Development League Draft was the ninth draft of the National Basketball Association Development League (NBADL). The draft was held on November 5, 2009 before the 2009–10 season. In this draft, all 16 of the league's teams took turns selecting eligible players. The D-League uses a "serpentine" format whereby the order of selections for each team alternates in each round. For example, the Albuquerque Thunderbirds won the number one overall selection, but in round two they picked last (16th selection, 32nd overall).

Carlos Powell of South Carolina was the first overall selection and was taken by Albuquerque Thunderbirds. Coincidentally, Powell had been selected second overall in the 2007 Draft, making him the only player to have been chosen as the first and second overall selections in D-League Draft history. Six players taken in the 2009 Draft had also previously been selected in an NBA Draft: Deron Washington (2008), JamesOn Curry (2007), Latavious Williams (2010), Orien Greene (2005), Reece Gaines (2003) and Yaroslav Korolev (2005). Two players, Nate Miles and Brian Kortovich, played college basketball solely at the junior college level. The highest drafted international player was Amara Sy, who holds a dual citizenship with both Mali and France, as the Bakersfield Jam selected him fourth overall.

Although some of the players chosen in the 2009 NBA Development League Draft had played semi-professional and/or professional basketball after college graduation, only the United States colleges they attended are listed.

Key

Draft

References
General

Specific

draft
NBA G League draft
NBA Development League draft
NBA Development League draft
NBA Development League draft
Basketball in Atlanta
Events in Atlanta